The 1936 Llanelli by-election was held on 26 March 1936.  The by-election was held due to the death of the incumbent Labour MP, John Henry Williams.  It was won by the Labour candidate Jim Griffiths.

References

1936 in Wales
1930s elections in Wales
Llanelli
History of Carmarthenshire
1936 elections in the United Kingdom
By-elections to the Parliament of the United Kingdom in Welsh constituencies
20th century in Carmarthenshire